Dendrobium eungellensis, is an epiphytic orchid in the family Orchidaceae and is endemic to northern Queensland. It has dark greenish brown pseudobulbs with up to three leaves on the end and up to eight fragrant white flowers with thin, spreading sepals and petals. It grows in open forest in the Eungella National Park.

Description 
Dendrobium eungellensis is an epiphytic herb that usually forms small clumps. The side lobes curve towards the column and are purplish. The middle lobe is egg-shaped with three yellowish green ridges along its midline.

Taxonomy and naming
This orchid was first formally described in 2006 by David Jones and Mark Clements from a specimen collected from Cockies Creek State Forest and which later flowered in the Australian National Botanic Gardens. It was given the name Tropilis eungellensis and the description was published in Australian Orchid Research. In 2014, Julian Shaw changed the name to Dendrobium eungellensis. The specific epithet (eungellensis) refers to the main distribution of the species - the ending -ensis is a Latin suffix meaning "of" or "in".

Distribution and habitat
Dendrobium eungellensis grows on trees, often on Eucalyptus crebra on slopes and in gullies in open forest and near rainforest. It is apparently restricted to the ranges to the west of Mackay.

References

eungellensis
Orchids of Queensland
Plants described in 2006